This is a list of all the Ultra prominent peaks (with topographic prominence greater than 1,500 metres) in Tibet, China, East Asia and neighbouring areas of Burma and India, including South India and Sri Lanka.

Kunlun Mountains and Northeastern Tibet Plateau

Western Tibet and neighboring areas

South-eastern Tibet and neighboring areas

Yunnan

Daxue Mountains of Sichuan

Contiguous Eastern China

Taiwan and Hainan

South India and Sri Lanka
,

References

External links 
E. Jurgalski and others:
List of Ultras in Tibet
List of Ultras in Sinkiang
List of Ultras in Sichuan and Yunnan
List of Ultras in Central and Eastern China, Taiwan and Korea
List of Ultras in Southern Indian Subcontinentl 

Tibet
Landforms of East Asia
Geography of East Asia
Mountains of Tibet